You Get Me may refer to:

 "You Get Me" (song)
 You Get Me (film)